Murat is a commune in the Cantal department in the Auvergne region in south-central France. On 1 January 2017, the former commune of Chastel-sur-Murat was merged into Murat.  Murat is the administrative seat of this new commune.

History 

On 24 June 1944, during World War II, 120 Muratais were deported, 80 never returned.

The French people from Murat were deported via Compiègne to the Neuengamme concentration camp and most of them had to work in the subcamp (in German: Außenlager) Farge concentration camp. At begin of June, 2012 a monument in the Memorial wood on the gardening area of former concentration camp was established: It was donated by the city of Murat, to remember what happened in Murat and to commemorate the deported and murdered inhabitants. The columns of basalt remember July 1944 when the Maquisards from Murat, Cantal were deported and afterwards murdered in the Neuengamme concentration camp and its affiliates. In total 75 men out of 103 died in the concentration camp.

Geography

Location 
It is surrounded by three basalt outcrops, the vestiges of former volcanoes, the Rocher de Bredons, where there is a priory church dating from the 12th century, the rocher de Bonnevie, where there is an 8-metre high statue of the Virgin Mary known as  Notre-Dame de la Haute-Auvergne, and the Rocher de Chastel, where the 12th century chapel of St Antoine stands. A market is held every Friday.

Population

Administration
Mayor (maire in French) of the municipal council:

Personalities
 Olivier Magne
Raymond Leopold Bruckberger, writer
 Henri de Castellane, politician. His grandson was Paul Ernest Boniface de Castellane who married Anna Gould

See also
Communes of the Cantal department

References

External links

 Volcano park of Auvergne on the UNEP-WCMC site
 Albepierre-Bredons

Communes of Cantal
Auvergne
Cantal communes articles needing translation from French Wikipedia